The Pakistan Ulema Council (PUC) is a  Muslim umbrella group and organization in Pakistan whose members include Islamic clerics and legal scholars from a range of Islamic traditions. Maulana Tahir Mehmood Ashrafi is its current chief. The organization was established initially to support a Christian girl who was charged with blasphemy.  

Pakistan Ulema Council was established in 1990. The fundamental reason for establishing the PUC was to put an end to the growing sectarian violence and interfaith confrontation in the country, and to spread Islam's true message of peace, love, forbearance, harmony and services to mankind throughout the world. Keeping this objective in mind, the PUC chose the following Quranic commandment as its manifesto: "Co-operate with each other in 'righteousness' and 'piety', not in 'sin' and 'hostility.'"

Views

Protection of minorities in Pakistan
Pakistan Ulema Council joined hands with the Pakistan Interfaith League, which includes Christians, Sikhs and other religions called for justice for the Christian girl who is accused of blasphemy. People gathered at the event demanded an unbiased investigation and also asked that those making false allegations be punished. In 2020, the Pakistan Ulema Council also supported the construction of Hindu temple in Islamabad stating that “To have their own place of worship and offer a life as per their faith and tradition are the right given to all non-Muslims in the Constitution and as well as in Sharia”.

Fatwa denouncing honour killings
The council issued a fatwa (religious edict) denouncing and prohibiting honour killings and said that honour killings were "un-Islamic" and "inhuman". The Islamic clergy elaborated that "[A] daughter is a gift by Allah" and that "Daughter is a gift not a problem". One woman protester held up a sign saying, "There is no honor in killing."

All Pakistan Ulema Council further stated that it was the responsibility of the Pakistani government and the court system to punish those guilty of this crime with the harshest possible sentences. The council will issue a more detailed verdict on 5 June 2014 which will be from an even more diverse range of religious groups.

Fatwa denouncing the kafir declaration
The council issued a fatwa which said that declaring other Islamic sects such as Shia as kafir (non-believers) was against Islam. The fatwa was announced to promote inter-sectarian tolerance by acknowledging that there was diversity in the way in which Islam is practised by different sects such as Sunni, Shia and different expressions of religion such as Sufism which was targeted by extremists. The use of loudspeakers except for the adhan (call to prayer) and the Friday sermon was also banned.

All Pakistan Ulema Council also decided that printing and distribution of material promoting hatred and violence would be banned from social networking websites and the internet. At this conference, Sardar Muhammad Yousuf, Minister for Religious Affairs and Interfaith Harmony stated that the Constitution of Pakistan protects the minorities, gives equal rights to all Pakistani citizens regardless of their religion.

Denouncing ISIL activities
The council denounced the activities of Islamic State of Iraq and the Levant (known as ISIL, ISIS, IS, and Daesh), in a statement the council said, "Islam and Muslims cannot support the killing of innocent people and destruction of their properties at the hands of ISIS", it asked "people and youth in Islamic countries to not cooperate with any violent group whose teachings or actions are against the teachings of Islam and Mohammad."

References

Islamic organisations based in Pakistan
Pakistani clergy